As the U.S. Pro Tennis Championships was an exhibition tournament during the early 1990s, no doubles tournaments were played at that time. The last edition was played in 1989, and was won by Andrés Gómez and Alberto Mancini. Both players retired from professional tennis in 1993 and 1994, respectively.

Jacco Eltingh and Paul Haarhuis won the title by defeating Dave Randall and Jack Waite 6–4, 6–2 in the final.

Seeds

Draw

Draw

References

External links
 Official results archive (ATP)
 Official results archive (ITF)

U.S. Pro Tennis Championships
MFS Pro Tennis Championships
MFS Pro Tennis Championships